STTC may refer to:

Space–time trellis code
United States Army Simulation and Training Technology Center